Min Htwe was a principal queen consort of King Nanda of Toungoo Dynasty of Myanmar (Burma) from 1583 to 1599. The second daughter of Viceroy Minkhaung II of Toungoo, along with her two sisters Min Phyu and Min Pu, married her first cousin Nanda in 1583. The marriages of state solidified the ties between Minkhaung II and Nanda, the High King. At Pegu (Bago), she became the Queen of the Central Palace.

Htwe lost her office in 1599 when Nanda surrendered to the forces of her brother Minye Thihathu II of Toungoo and Raza II of Mrauk-U. She was part of the defeated royal family that was brought back to her native Toungoo (Taungoo) in 1600. She became a widow on 30 November 1600 when her nephew Natshinnaung assassinated Nanda. On 21 November 1602, Minye Thihathu II married her off to his second son (and her nephew) Minye Kyawswa of Toungoo, who was at least 20 years, perhaps even 25 years, her junior.

She remained at Toungoo until 1610 when King Anaukpetlun, who had captured Toungoo, sent her, along with other royals, to his capital Ava (Inwa). It is unclear if she and her nephew and husband Minye Kyawswa remained married. She did not follow Minye Kyawswa to Kyaukmaw where he was appointed governor-general. Minye Kyawswa died in August 1612 in a battle with the forces of Portuguese Syriam.

The queen had no issue.

Ancestry
The queen was descended from the Prome and ultimately Ava royalty from her mother's side. Her father Minkhaung was a half-brother of King Bayinnaung.

Notes

References

Bibliography
 
 

Queens consort of Toungoo dynasty
1550s births
Year of death unknown
16th-century Burmese women
17th-century Burmese women